Khazai may refer to:
 Khazai-ye Olya
 Khazai-ye Sofla